Pascual Bonfiglio (born March 15, 1907, date of death unknown) was an Argentine boxer who competed in the 1928 Summer Olympics.

In 1928 he was eliminated in the quarter-finals of the lightweight class after losing his fight to the upcoming silver medalist Stephen Halaiko.

1928 Olympic results
Below is the record of Pascual Bonfiglio, a lightweight boxer from Argentina who competed at the 1928 Amsterdam Olympics:

 Round of 32: defeated Valle Resko (Finland) on points
 Round of 16: defeated Franz Dubbers (Germany) on points
 Quarterfinal: lost to Stephen Halaiko (United States) on points

External links
 
 Pascual Bonfiglio's profile at Sports Reference.com

1907 births
Year of death missing
Lightweight boxers
Olympic boxers of Argentina
Boxers at the 1928 Summer Olympics
Argentine male boxers